Polydeuces , or Saturn XXXIV, is a small natural satellite of Saturn that is co-orbital with the moon Dione and librates around its trailing Lagrangian point. Its diameter is estimated to be 2–3 km. Dione's other co-orbital moon is Helene, which is bigger and located at the leading L4 point.

Polydeuces was discovered by the Cassini Imaging Team on October 24, 2004, in images taken on October 21, 2004, and given the temporary designation S/2004 S 5. Subsequent searches of earlier Cassini imaging showed it in images as far back as April 9, 2004.  

Of the four known Lagrangian co-orbitals in the Saturn system ('trojan moon'), Polydeuces wanders the farthest from its Lagrangian point: its distance behind Dione varies from 33.9° to 91.4° with a period of 790.931 days (for comparison,  trails Dione by 60°). Polydeuces's libration is large enough that it takes on some qualities of a tadpole orbit, as evidenced by the clear asymmetry between excursions towards and away from Dione. In the course of one such cycle, Polydeuces's orbital radius also varies by about ± 7660 km with respect to Dione's.

The name Polydeuces was approved by the IAU Working Group on Planetary System Nomenclature on January 21, 2005. In Greek mythology, Polydeuces is another name for Pollux, twin brother of Castor, son of Zeus and Leda.

Due to gravitational interactions with Dione, its surface may be in hydrostatic equilibrium but not its interior, similar to Methone being in hydrostatic equilibrium due to interactions with Mimas.

See also
 Moons of Saturn

Notes

References

Further reading

External links 

 Polydeuces Profile by NASA's Solar System Exploration
 IAU Working Group on Planetary System Nomenclature
 Cassini news release on ring and moon discoveries, via Spaceflight Now (February 24, 2005)

Moons of Saturn
Trojan moons
20041024
Moons with a prograde orbit